Rise of the Guardians is a 2012 American 3D computer-animated fantasy  action-adventure film produced by DreamWorks Animation and distributed by Paramount Pictures. The film was directed by Peter Ramsey (in his feature directorial debut) from a screenplay by David Lindsay-Abaire, based on the book series The Guardians of Childhood and the short film The Man in the Moon by William Joyce. It stars the voices of Chris Pine, Alec Baldwin, Jude Law, Isla Fisher, and Hugh Jackman. The film tells a story about Guardians Santa Claus, the Tooth Fairy, the Easter Bunny, and the Sandman, who enlist Jack Frost to stop the evil Pitch Black from engulfing the world in darkness in a fight of dreams.

Rise of the Guardians was released in the United States on November 21, 2012. It grossed $306.9 million worldwide against a budget of $145 million, but lost an estimated $87 million due to marketing and distribution costs. It was nominated for the Golden Globe Award for Best Animated Feature Film and the Annie Award for Best Animated Feature.

It was the last DreamWorks Animation film to be distributed by Paramount Pictures. Starting with The Croods (2013), 20th Century Fox would distribute DreamWorks' films until Captain Underpants: The First Epic Movie (2017).

Plot

Jack Frost awakens from a frozen pond with amnesia and disappears upon realizing that no one can see or hear him. 300 years later, Jack enjoys delivering snow days to schoolchildren, but still feels upset that they do not believe in him. At the North Pole, the Man in the Moon warns Nicholas St. North that Pitch Black is threatening the children of the world with his nightmares. North calls E. Aster Bunnymund, the Sandman, and the Tooth Fairy to arms, and they are told that Jack Frost has been chosen to be a new Guardian. Bunny brings him to the North Pole and North explains to Jack that every Guardian has a center which they are the Guardian of. 

Visiting Tooth's world, which resembles a palace in India, Jack learns that each and every baby tooth contains childhood memories of the children who lost it, Jack's teeth included. However, Pitch raids Tooth's home, kidnapping all of her subordinate tooth fairies except Baby Tooth and stealing all the teeth, thus preventing Tooth from sharing Jack's memories and weakening children's belief in her. In order to thwart Pitch's plan, the group decides to collect children's teeth. During their journey, a quarrel between North and Bunny awakens a boy, Jamie. Since he still believes, he can see everybody except for Jack. Pitch's Nightmares then attack, provoking Sandy as the Guardian of Dreams. Jack tries to intervene, but Pitch overwhelms Sandy, who seemingly disappears.

As Easter approaches, the Guardians travel to Bunny's home and paint eggs with the unexpected aid of Jamie's little sister, Sophie. After Jack takes Sophie home, a voice lures him to Pitch's lair. Pitch taunts Jack with his memories and fear of non-belief, distracting Jack long enough for the Nightmares to destroy the eggs, causing children to stop believing in Bunny. With the Guardians' trust in him lost, Jack flees to Antarctica and battles with Pitch, who breaks Jack's magic staff and throws him down a chasm. Unlocking the memories inside his teeth, Jack learns that he was a mortal teenager who drowned in saving his younger sister. Inspired, he repairs his staff and returns to the lair to rescue the kidnapped fairies.

Due to Pitch, every child in the world except Jamie disbelieves, drastically weakening the Guardians. Finding Jamie's belief wavering, Jack makes it snow in his room, renewing Jamie's belief and making him the first person to believe in Jack. Jack realizes that his center is fun and uses it to gather Jamie's friends and play, leading to renewed belief that bolsters their fight against Pitch and resurrects Sandy. The children's dreams prove stronger than the Nightmares, who turn on Pitch and drag him to the underworld. Jamie and his friends bid goodbye to the Guardians as Jack accepts his place as the Guardian of Fun.

Cast and characters
 Chris Pine as Jack Frost, the Spirit of Winter. Jack is a teenage hellion who enjoys creating mischief and has no interest in being bound by rules or obligations; he just wants to use his staff to spread his winter magic for the sake of fun, but also wants to be believed in.   Via his staff, he possesses potent cryokinesis. At the end of the film, Jack became the Guardian of Fun. 
 Jude Law as Pitch Black/The Boogeyman, the essence of fear and the Nightmare King. He has dark hair and wears a black robe/cloak. Despite being the literal embodiment of terror, ironically, at the resolution, he's scared of his own nightmares after being forgotten.
 Alec Baldwin as Nicholas St. North, the leader of the Guardians, and the Guardian of Wonder. He lives at the North Pole in the Ice Castle and is served by loyal North Pole natives, the Yetis (who built the castle and workshop) and the Christmas Elves. He has a Russian accent/culture persona.
 Hugh Jackman as E. Aster Bunnymund, called Bunny for short, the keeper and bringer of Easter eggs as the Easter Bunny and Guardian of Hope. He shares his voice actor's Australian accent.
 Isla Fisher as Toothiana, called Tooth for short, the tooth collector known as the Tooth Fairy and the Guardian of Memories. Tooth is part human and part hummingbird, loosely resembling a Kinnari. Assisted by mini fairies that are split-off extensions of herself, she collects the children's teeth, which hold their most precious memories. Tooth stores them in her palace and returns memories when they are needed the most.
 Sandy the Sandman is the Guardian of Dreams and the oldest of the Guardians, being the first Guardian chosen by the Man in the Moon. He doesn't/can't speak, but communicates through sand images that he conjures above his head.
 Dakota Goyo as Jamie Bennett, a child who has not given up on believing in the Guardians.
 Georgie Grieve as Sophie Bennett, Jamie's little sister
 Jacob Bertrand as Monty
 Dominique Grund as Cupcake
 Olivia Mattingly as Mary, Jack's sister
 Ryan Crego as Burgess Dog Walker
 Peter Ramsey and April Lawrence as Burgess Pedestrians

Production
In 2005, William Joyce and Reel FX launched a joint venture, Aimesworth Amusements, to produce CG-animated feature films, one of which was set to be The Guardians of Childhood, based on Joyce's idea. The film was not realized, but they did create a short animated film, The Man in the Moon, directed by Joyce, which introduced the Guardians idea, and served as an inspiration for the film.

Early in 2008, Joyce sold the film rights to DreamWorks Animation, after the studio assured him it would respect his vision for the characters and that he would be involved with the creative process. In November 2009, it was revealed that DreamWorks had hired Peter Ramsey to make his feature debut as director of what was then titled The Guardians, and playwright David Lindsay-Abaire to write the script, Lindsay-Abaire had previously worked with Joyce by co-writing the screenplay for Robots. Joyce acted as a co-director for the first few years, but left this position after the death of his daughter Mary Katherine, who died in May 2010, from complications relating to her brain cancer positive diagnosis. Joyce continued to work on the film only as an executive producer, while Ramsey took the helm solo as a full time director, making him the first African American to direct a big-budget CG animated film as well as making it one of the first Dreamworks films to have only one director instead of two and not have a co-director. As with some previous DreamWorks films, Guillermo del Toro came on board to join Joyce as an executive producer. Present almost from the beginning, he was able to help shape the story, character design, theme and structure of the film. He said he was proud that the filmmakers were making parts of the film "dark and moody and poetic," and expressed hope this might "set a different tone for family movies, for entertainment movies." The final title, Rise of the Guardians was announced in early 2011, along with the first cast.

Roger Deakins, the cinematographer who had already worked on the previous DreamWorks' film, How to Train Your Dragon, advised on the lighting to achieve its real look. He selected photographic references for color keys, and during the production gave notes on contrast, saturation, depth of field and light intensity. The film contains a lot of special effects, particularly the volumetric particles for depicting Sandman and Pitch. For this, DreamWorks Animation developed OpenVDB, a more efficient tool and format for manipulating and storing volume data, like smoke and other amorphous materials. OpenVDB had been already used on Puss in Boots and Madagascar 3: Europe's Most Wanted, and was released in August 2012 for free as an open-source project with a hope to become an industry standard.

Although the film is based on Joyce's book series, it contains differences from the books. The book series, begun in 2011, explains the origins of the characters, while the film takes place about 300 years after the books, and shows how the characters function in present time. Joyce explained, "Because I don't want people to read the book and then go see the movie and go, 'Oh, I like the book better,' and I also didn't want them to know what happens in the movie. And I also knew that during the progress of film production, a lot of things can change. So I wanted to have a sort of distance, so we were able to invoke the books and use them to help us figure out the world of the movie, but I didn't want them to be openly competitive to each other." The idea for the Guardians came from Joyce's daughter, who asked him "if he thought Santa Claus had ever met the Easter Bunny." The film includes a dedication to her, as well a song, "Still Dream," sung over the end credits.

Originally, the film was set to be released on November 2, 2012, but DreamWorks Animation pushed the film to November 21, 2012 to avoid competition with Pixar's upcoming film Monsters University, which in turn had been pushed to November 2, 2012 to avoid competition with The Twilight Saga: Breaking Dawn – Part 2. Monsters University was then pushed to June 21, 2013, with Disney's Wreck-It Ralph taking its place.

Music

French composer Alexandre Desplat composed the original music for the film, which was released on November 13, 2012, by Varèse Sarabande. The score was recorded in London at Abbey Road Studios and Air Studios, and performed by the London Symphony Orchestra, with a choral contribution by London Voices. David Lindsay-Abaire wrote the lyrics for the end-credit song, "Still Dream," which was performed by soprano Renée Fleming. Stravinsky's Firebird Suite can also be heard during the scene where North first appears. This film marks the first time that a DreamWorks Animation film has not been composed by Hans Zimmer or a member of his Remote Control Productions family of composers (mainly John Powell, Henry Jackman, Lorne Balfe, Harry Gregson-Williams or his brother Rupert Gregson-Williams).

Release

Rise of the Guardians had its premiere on October 10, 2012, at The Mill Valley Film Festival in Mill Valley, California, followed by the international premiere at The International Rome Film Festival on November 13, 2012. Under distribution by Paramount Pictures, the film was released on November 21, 2012, in American theaters. Digitally re-mastered into IMAX 3D, it was shown in limited international and domestic IMAX theaters. It was the second film released in the firm Barco's Auro 11.1 3D audio format, after Red Tails. The film was also shown in Dolby Atmos, a surround sound technology introduced in 2012. Rise of the Guardians was the last DreamWorks Animation film distributed by Paramount, as DreamWorks has signed a five-year distribution deal with 20th Century Fox, which started in 2013 with The Croods.

Home media
Rise of the Guardians was released on Blu-ray Disc (2D and 3D) and DVD on March 12, 2013.

That was the last DreamWorks Animation home media release to be distributed by Paramount Home Entertainment, since 20th Century Fox announced its distribution agreement with DreamWorks Animation a few months before the theatrical release. The film was more successful at home media sales than at the box office, having at the end of the second quarter of 2013 "the highest box office to DVD conversion ratio among major releases." In the first quarter of 2013, it sold 3.2 million home entertainment units worldwide, and in the second quarter 0.9 million units, for a total of 4.1 million units.

It was re-released on DVD on November 5, 2013, and comes with a wind-up marching elf toy.  As of October 2014, 5.8 million home entertainment units were sold worldwide.  In July 2014, the film's distribution rights were purchased by DreamWorks Animation from Paramount Pictures and transferred to 20th Century Fox. The rights were moved to Universal Pictures in 2018 after the buyout of DreamWorks Animation by Comcast/NBCUniversal. It was re-released on DVD and Blu-ray on June 5, 2018, by Universal Pictures Home Entertainment.

Reception

Critical response
On the review aggregator website Rotten Tomatoes, the film has an approval rating of 74% based on 160 reviews, with an average rating of 6.60/10. The website's critical consensus reads: "A sort of Avengers for the elementary school set, Rise of the Guardians is wonderfully animated and briskly paced, but it's only so-so in the storytelling department." Metacritic, which assigns a rating out of 100 top reviews from mainstream critics, calculated a score of 58 based on 37 reviews, which indicates "mixed or average reviews". Audiences polled by CinemaScore gave the film an average grade of "A" on an A+ to F scale.

Carrie Rickey of The Philadelphia Inquirer gave the film three and a half stars out of four and found that the film's characters have "a primal familiarity, as though they were developed by a tag team of Maurice Sendak and Walt Disney." Olly Richards of Empire wrote, "It's gorgeously designed, deftly written and frequently laugh-out-loud funny. For child or adult, this is a fantasy to get lost in." The Washington Posts Michael O'Sullivan also gave the film a positive review and said, "Thoughts become things. That's the message of Rise of the Guardians, a charming if slightly dark and cobwebbed animated feature about how believing in something makes it real, or real enough." Roger Ebert of the Chicago Sun-Times gave the film three stars out of four and wrote in his review, "There's an audience for this film. It's not me. I gather younger children will like the breakneck action, the magical ability to fly and the young hero who has tired of only being a name." Though he did say, "Their parents and older siblings may find the 89-minute running time quite long enough."

Todd McCarthy of The Hollywood Reporter called the film "a lively but derivative 3D storybook spree for some unlikely action heroes." Conversely, Justin Chang in Variety said, "Even tots may emerge feeling slightly browbeaten by this colorful, strenuous and hyperactive fantasy, which has moments of charm and beauty but often resembles an exploding toy factory rather than a work of honest enchantment." Joe Morgenstern of The Wall Street Journal found that the film "lacks a resonant center," and that the script, "seems to have been written by committee, with members lobbying for each major character, and the action, set in vast environments all over the map, spreads itself so thin that a surfeit of motion vitiates emotion."

Box office
Rise of the Guardians grossed $103.4 million in the United States and Canada, and $203.5 million in other countries, for a worldwide total of $306.9 million.

In North America, the film opened to $32.3 million over its extended five-day weekend, and with $23.8 million over the three-day weekend, it reached fourth place behind The Twilight Saga: Breaking Dawn – Part 2, Skyfall, and Lincoln. The film's opening was the lowest debut for a DreamWorks Animation film since Flushed Away. While the film did gross more than double of its $145 million budget, it still did not turn a profit for DreamWorks Animation due to its high production and marketing costs, forcing the studio to take an $87 million write-down. This marked the first time that the studio had lost money on an animated film since Sinbad: Legend of the Seven Seas. As a result of this combined with other factors, in February 2013, the studio announced it was laying off 350 employees as part of a company-wide restructuring.

Additionally, the studio was heavily dependent on the success of Rise of the Guardians to fund other studio projects, most notably, the ill-fated Me and My Shadow project. But due to the failure to gain a stable box office response, it heavily affected the studio's ability to release original movies.

Accolades

Video game

A video game based on the film was released by D3 Publisher on November 20, 2012 in North America, and released on November 23, 2012 in Europe. It allows gamers to lead the Guardians in their battle against Pitch. The game is a 3D beat-em-up, where the player travels through each of the worlds: Burgess, North Pole, Bunnymund Valley, Tooth Palace, and Sandman's Ship, to fight Pitch's army of Nightmares. The player can switch between all five guardians at any time, and freely customize their powers, and they learn new special abilities as they level up. All the game versions support up to 4-player gameplay. It is available on the Wii, Wii U, Xbox 360, PlayStation 3, Nintendo DS, and Nintendo 3DS.

Possible sequel
After the release of the film, the creators of Rise of the Guardians expressed hope that the strong average grade of "A" given to the film by audiences surveyed by CinemaScore and an enthusiastic word-of-mouth would gather support for the "chance to make a sequel or two." Author and co-producer of the series, William Joyce, also mentioned in March 2013 that he was still in talks about a sequel with DreamWorks Animation: "There is something that we are proposing that we hope they will want to do." As of December 2022, no future films have been produced or developed.

See also
 List of Christmas films
 Santa Claus in film

Notes

References

External links

 
 
 
 
 

2012 films
2012 3D films
2012 animated films
2012 computer-animated films
2010s fantasy adventure films
Fiction set in 1712
Films set in the 1710s
American 3D films
American children's animated adventure films
American children's animated fantasy films
American Christmas films
American computer-animated films
American fantasy adventure films
2010s children's fantasy films
Animated Christmas films
Animated films based on children's books
Animated films about rabbits and hares
Animated films about magic
Animated crossover films
DreamWorks Animation animated films
Easter Bunny in film
2010s English-language films
Features based on short films
Films directed by Peter Ramsey
Films about tooth fairies
Films scored by Alexandre Desplat
Films about amnesia
Animated films about children
Films about elves
Films set in Antarctica
Films set in the Arctic
Films with screenplays by David Lindsay-Abaire
IMAX films
Paramount Pictures films
Paramount Pictures animated films
Jack Frost
Moon in film
Films about Yeti
Santa Claus in film
Sandman in film
3D animated films
2010s Christmas films
2012 directorial debut films
Films about Easter
2010s American films